The Republican People's Party was founded in 1919 during the Sivas Congress.

Formation 

During the Turkish War of Independence, 1919–1923, the parliament in Ankara was composed of different types of deputies. To have harmony among his followers, Mustafa Kemal and his colleagues formed the Association for the Defence of National Rights of Anatolia and Rumelia (Anadolu ve Rumeli Müdâfaa-i Hukuk Cemiyeti). The opposition to Mustafa Kemal or to the commissars elected by the parliament united under the name of "second group for Defence of the Law", often shortened simply to "second group" (the followers of Mustafa Kemal were later called "first group"). Although the second group was always in the minority, it could create active opposition within the parliament. In January 1923, Mustafa Kemal announced that first group would be transformed into a party named Halk Fırkası (People's Party). In May 1923, the parliament called a bill for new elections, most probably because Mustafa Kemal and his colleagues wanted to guarantee the Treaty of Lausanne's approval by a more unanimous parliament. The People's Party was formally founded only after the 1923 elections. The 1923 elections were definitely the victory of the forthcoming party, because of its leader's reputation after the military victory of the War of Independence and the liquidation of the second group. Because of the unanimity of this second parliament, the republic was proclaimed, the Treaty of Lausanne was accepted and the Caliphate was abolished.

However, in 1924, after the short-period of one-party rule, many of Mustafa Kemal's ex-colleagues, for many reasons (their growing loss of power, their opposition to the short period of a one-party rule's revolutionary activities, etc.), including Rauf Orbay, Kâzım Karabekir, Ali Fuat Cebesoy and many others founded an opposition party called Progressive Republican Party. After the foundation of an opposition party, the People's Party changed its name to "Republican People's Party" (Cumhuriyet Halk Partisi) (CHP). The life of the Progressive Republican Party was short. In 1925, the Kurdish lead Sheikh Said rebellion sparked in the east of Turkey. The party faced accusations of their involvement in the rebellion and as well in an alleged assassination attempt against Mustafa Kemal and was closed on 5 June by the government. As a consequence, Karabekir and many members of the party were court-martialled and imprisoned. Karabekir was released after being found innocent. From 1925 until 1946, Turkey was under one-party rule, with one interruption; Liberal Republican Party, which had been founded by Atatürk and was led by one of his closest friends, Ali Fethi Okyar. This party was closed down by its founders shortly after the İzmir meeting, which was a demonstration against the CHP.

One-party period 

In the period of 1925–1930, the Republican People's Party introduced measures transforming Turkey into a modern state. In the period of 1930–1939, the party transformed itself and tried to broaden its ideology (for instance, the 'Six Arrows' were adopted in 1930). In the parties third convention, it clarified their approach towards the religious minorities of the Christians and the Jews, accepting them as real Turks as long as they adhere to the national ideal and use the Turkish language.

The day after Atatürk's death, his ally İsmet İnönü was elected the second president and assumed leadership of the CHP. During the general nationwide congress of the CHP on 26 December 1938, İsmet İnönü was elected as "everlasting CHP leader". The delegates awarded Atatürk the title "eternal chief", and awarded İnönü the title "national chief". The party was associated with anti-communism. Soon after being elected as president, İsmet İnönü adopted a policy of neutrality despite attempts by the Allies and Axis powers to bring Turkey into World War II.

Beginning Turkey's multiparty period 

A general election was held in Turkey on 21 July 1946 – the first multi-party elections in the country's history. The result was a victory for the Republican People's Party, which won 395 of the 465 seats, amid criticism that the election did not live up to democratic standards. However, four years later, Turkey's first free general election was held on 14 May 1950 and led to the CHP losing power to the Democrat Party (DP) led by Celal Bayar. İnönü presided over a peaceful transition of power, after which Bayar became the third President of Turkey while Adnan Menderes became Prime Minister. The 1950 elections marked the end of the CHP's last majority government. The party has not been able to regain a parliamentary majority in any subsequent election.

During the 1940s, the CHP established the Village Institutes, which were part of an enlightenment project developed in order to reduce the gap that existed between urban and rural areas. Various scientists, writers, teachers, and doctors graduated from Village Institutes; and supported Turkey's modernization efforts, before the program was ended by Adnan Menderes's DP government. UNICEF regards the Village Institutes project as exemplary and has placed its curriculum under protection.

On 26 November 1951, during the ninth CHP Congress, the youth branch and the women's branch of the CHP were formed. On 22 June 1953, the establishment of trade unions and vocational chambers was proposed, and the right to strike for workers was added to the party program. In 1954, the CHP lost a second consecutive general election to the DP, attaining only 35.4% of the total vote. The DP captured 505 seats with 57.6% vote, due to the winner-take-all system in place. Following this defeat, the CHP began intensifying its opposition tactics and increased its share of the votes to 41%, gaining 178 seats, in the 1957 election. The DP won 424 seats with 47.9% vote amid growing concerns about the DP's authoritarian tendencies in government.

1960 Coup 

Following the military coup of 1960, a "National Unity Committee" was formed by higher-ranking soldiers led by Cemal Gürsel. The National Unity Committee abolished the Democratic Party and started trials to punish Democratic Party leaders for their alleged dictatorial regime. As a result, on 16 and 17 September 1961, ousted Prime Minister Adnan Menderes, Foreign Minister Fatin Rüştü Zorlu, and Finance Minister Hasan Polatkan were hanged in the İmralı island prison. President Celal Bayar was forgiven due to his old age, but sentenced to life imprisonment. CHP leader İsmet İnönü sent a letter to Gürsel raising concerns regarding the legal process, calling on the death sentences of the ousted government ministers to be commuted in order to calm social tensions following the coup. Nevertheless, right-wing parties have since continuously attacked the CHP for their perceived involvement of the party in the hanging of Adnan Menderes.

In 1961, the Justice Party was established, claiming to be the successor to the Democratic Party. In the meantime, the National Unity Committee established an interim House of Representatives instead of the Grand National Assembly, in order to prepare a new constitution for Turkey. In the new constitution, the Constitutional Court was to be established, to prevent the government from violating the constitution. The 1961 constitution is widely accepted as to be the most liberal and democratic constitution in Turkish history. Also, the winner-take-all electoral system was immediately abolished, and a proportional representation system was introduced. The new constitution brought Turkey a bicameral parliament, composed of the Senate of the Republic as the upper chamber, and the National Assembly as the lower chamber. The National Unity Committee chairman General Cemal Gürsel was elected as the fourth president of Turkey.

With proportional representation in place, CHP emerged as the first party in the general election of 1961 with 36.7% of the vote. The Justice Party gained received 34.8% of the vote. CHP leader İsmet İnönü formed a grand coalition with the Justice Party and became Prime Minister for a third and final time. This was the first coalition government in Turkey, lasting until 1962 when a split between the CHP and the AP on the issue of amnesty for former DP members resulted in the government's dissolution. İnönü formed a three-party coalition government with the New Turkey Party (YTP) and the Republican Villagers Nation Party (CKMP), though the loss of support for the two junior parties in the 1963 local elections resulted in the government being disbanded in 1963. İnönü was forced to form a fragile minority government supported by Independents, though the government was able to survive a vote of confidence due to outside support from the YTP. The government was overthrown in February 1965 after the opposition parties in parliament united to block the CHP's budget, causing İnönü to resign as Prime Minister. The 29th government of Turkey was formed by Independent MP Suat Hayri Ürgüplü, who had the support of the Justice Party, YTP, CKMP and the Nation Party (MP). Ürgüplü's government presided over the 1965 general election, in which the Justice Party won a parliamentary majority. Since 1965, the party adopted new Left of Centre (Ortanın solu) programme switching to centre-left politics.

İnönü remained as opposition leader and the leader of the CHP until 8 May 1972, losing a second general election in 1969 to the AP. He was succeeded as leader by Bülent Ecevit and died a year later in 1973. He is the most recent President of Turkey to have served as an active member of the CHP during his term.

Bülent Ecevit (1972–1980) 

In 1971, the army brought down the Justice government of Süleyman Demirel. The secretary general of CHP Bülent Ecevit protested against military intervention and resigned from his post. He also criticized İnönü for not criticizing the intervention. By his quick and energetic reactions, he gained support from the intellectuals and in 1972, he succeeded İsmet İnönü as the leader of the party. Following some interim governments, CHP won 1973 elections with 33% of the vote and formed a coalition with the National Salvation Party (MSP) of Necmettin Erbakan. Bülent Ecevit began to take on a distinct left wing role in politics and, although remaining staunchly nationalist, tried to implement socialism into the ideology of CHP. The support of the party also increased after Turkish intervention in Cyprus following a coup which had been staged by the Cypriot National Guard led by Nikos Sampson.

However, the CHP and the MSP had very diverged ideologies, especially on secularism and in 1975 a new coalition government led by Demirel was formed by four right wing parties called the First National Front Government. Nevertheless, the CHP was still the most popular party and won the 1977 elections with 41% of the vote, which is a record for the party. Although the CHP couldn't gain the majority of seats and from 1977 to 1979, the CHP was the main party of two brief coalition governments. But in 1980, the Justice Party returned with Demirel. The back and forth between CHP and Justice came to an end when the military performed a coup and banned all political parties.

Recovery (1980–1992) 
After the 1980 military coup, the name "Republican People's Party" and the abbreviation CHP were banned from use by the military regime. Until 1998, Turkey was ruled by the centre-right Motherland Party (ANAP) and the True Path Party (DYP), unofficial successors of the Democrat Party and the Justice Party.

CHP followers also tried to establish parties, but they were not allowed to use the name CHP and were not allowed to elect the well known pre-1980 politicians to party posts. So they had to introduce new politicians. Three successor parties of CHP formed: the Populist Party (HP) of Necdet Calp, the Social Democracy Party of Erdal İnönü and the Democratic Left Party (DSP) of Rahşan Ecevit. These names were chosen to remind people of the CHP. Necdet Calp was the late İsmet İnönü's secretary while he was prime minister. Erdal İnönü was İsmet İnönü's son and Rahşan Ecevit was Bülent Ecevit's wife. After the ban on pre-1980 politicians was lifted in 1987, Bülent Ecevit took over the DSP in 1987. The ban on pre-1980 parties was lifted in 1992 and Erdal İnönü consolidated the successor parties back into the CHP. SODEP and HP merged in 1985 to form the Social Democratic Populist Party (SHP). Deniz Baykal refounded the Republican People's Party (CHP) in 1992 and SHP merged with the party in 1995. However Ecevit's DSP remained separate and to this day hasn't merged with the reformed CHP. Baykal is acknowledged to have steered the party to the center in opposition to the other main Kemalist party of the time, Ecevit's DSP.

Deniz Baykal (1992–2010) 
In 1991, since Turkey's election system had two large election thresholds post-1980 (10% nationwide and 15% local thresholds) and since the centre-left was divided into two parties (SHP and DSP), social democrats and democratic left groups had little power in parliament. Between 1991 and 1995, Turkey was ruled by the coalition of centre-right DYP and center-left SHP (later, the SHP joined the CHP). The Islamists returned with a new party, the Welfare Party (Refah), while the nationalist MHP took advantage of the disillusionment felt by former supporters of the Refah Party and the constant bickering of ANAP and DYP.

In 1995, the Islamist Welfare Party (Refah) entered parliament, and the CHP's share of the vote dropped further to 10%. It now seemed as if the CHP had been replaced as the main left-wing party. But the Welfare Party was banned in 1998, and during the 1990s the Democratic Left Party led by former CHP leader Bülent Ecevit gained popular support. In 1998, after the resignation of the Refah-DYP coalition following the 28 February "post-modern coup", ANAP formed a coalition government with the DSP and the small centre-right party Democratic Turkey Party (DTP), along with the support of CHP. However, due to big scandals, corruption and some illegal actions of this coalition, the CHP withdrew its support from the coalition and helped bring down the government with a "no confidence" vote. Just before the elections of 1999, the DSP formed an interim minority government with the support of the DYP and ANAP. Notably, PKK leader Abdullah Öcalan was captured in Kenya during this Ecevit period. Therefore, in the elections of 1999, the CHP failed to pass the 10% threshold (8.7% vote), winning no seats in parliament. Baykal resigned in 1999 and Altan Öymen became the new leader. But one year later, Baykal became the leader of the party again.

About a month after the 1999 general election, a coalition government between the DSP, MHP and ANAP was formed under the leadership of the DSP. Which passed much needed economic reform following the 2001 currency crisis. Because the DSP opposed the US invasion of Iraq, a campaign to divide the DSP and force a change of government in Turkey was started. When its coalition partner MHP called for early elections in the summer of 2002, it faced the electorate before the results of economic reforms could be felt. As a result, none of the coalition parties were able to pass the 10% national threshold. In the 2002 parliamentary elections, the CHP won 20% of the vote and 30% of the seats in parliament, and only it and the AKP (Justice and Development Party) entered parliament.

The CHP became the main opposition party again and Turkey's second largest party. It had begun the long road to recovery. However, this had very little to do with voters supporting CHP. Many were former DSP supporters who were angry at the economic crisis that many blamed on the Ecevit government. Also, many DSP and ANAP supporters left these parties for AKP as did many MHP and Fazilet (now Saadet party) members. Since the dramatic 2002 general election, the CHP has been racked by internal power struggles, and has been outclassed by the AKP government of Recep Tayyip Erdoğan. Many on the left were very critical of the leadership of CHP, especially Deniz Baykal, who they complained was stifling the party of young blood by turning away the young who turn either to apathy or even vote for the AKP. While the AKP boasted a young leadership who have lived through many of the difficulties of many in Turkey, the CHP were seen as an 'old guard' that did not represent modern Turkey. The leftists also are very critical of the party's continuous opposition to the removal of Article 301 of the Turkish penal code; which caused people to be prosecuted for "insulting Turkishness" including Nobel Prize winner author Orhan Pamuk, Elif Şafak, and the conviction of Turkish-Armenian journalist Hrant Dink, its attitude towards the minorities in Turkey, as well as its Cyprus policy.

In the local elections of 2004, its overall share of the vote held, largely through mopping up anti-Erdoğan votes among former supporters of smaller left-wing and secular right-wing parties, but was badly beaten by the AKP across the country, losing former strongholds such as Antalya.

In October 2004, the New Turkey Party (Yeni Türkiye Partisi, YTP) merged into the CHP. Baykal attempted fusing DSP and the CHP together under one roof, namely CHP, under his leadership. In order to present a strong alternative to the AKP in the 2007 general election, the DSP showed a sacrifice and entered the elections together with the CHP. The CHP suffered a heavy defeat, getting 7,300,234 votes (20.85% of the total). The CHP and DSP alliance received 20.9% of the votes and entered the parliament with 112 MPs (13 being DSP candidates) compared to 178 in 2002.. The party finished first only in the three Thracian provinces of Edirne, Tekirdağ, Kırklareli, as well as two provinces on the Aegean coast, which were İzmir and Muğla.

The CHP increased its vote share from 20.9% to 23.1% in the 2009 local elections. The party gained considerable ground by winning over Antalya, Giresun, Zonguldak, Sinop, Tekirdağ, and Aydın, despite losing Trabzon municipality. In 20 provinces of Turkey, the party received less than 3% of the votes. During the election, the party tried to attract conservative and devout Muslims to the party by allowing women who wear the hijab to become party members including promises to introduce Koran courses if requested in every district. However, the allowing of women wearing hijab into the party received a severe blow when a normally non-headscarved member of CHP (Kıymet Özgür) committed a provocation by wearing a black hijab and tried to get into an election bus in Istanbul. The incident raised questions about the CHP's initiatives in favor of religious freedoms. The new initiatives introduced were surprising inside and outside the party, and with military leaders.

On 10 May 2010, Deniz Baykal announced his resignation as leader of the Republican People's Party after a clandestinely made video tape of him, sitting on a bed where a woman is also eminent (identified as Nesrin Baytok, his former private secretary and a member of parliament) was leaked to the media. Although Baykal has stepped down from the chair of his party leadership, he remains active in politics for CHP as a parliament member.

Kemal Kılıçdaroğlu (2010–present) 

On 22 May 2010 the convention of the Republican People's Party elected Kemal Kılıçdaroğlu to be the new party leader. Kılıçdaroğlu set about immediately to reform the party. Many critics of the day commented positively how the Kılıçdaroğlu period would see the People's Republican Party move more to the left as in the time of Bülent Ecevit, in contrast to the Baykal period which had moved CHP more closer to centre politics to such an extent that left-wing intellectuals had started to claim how the CHP was becoming a right-wing party. Kılıçdaroğlu saw an immense rise in popularity and support throughout the country and for the first time in twenty years, the party became directly active in the eastern parts of the country. In late 2010, the party held a Great Election where the Party Leader's cabinet was reformed. It marked the complete end of the 'Baykal – Önder Sav' era where all opposition to the changing policy of the CHP was swiftly removed.

Kemal Kılıçdaroğlu's efforts seemed to work. CHP was able to increase the percentage of voters to 25.98% in the 2011 general election. Yet, in 2012, Kemal Kılıçdaroğlu faced an attempted rebellion by the old guard in his own party, reportedly supported by Baykal. However, the attempt failed and at the party congress held in 2012, Kılıçdaroğlu remained the CHP leader. This paved the way for him into following his plans for what he considers renovating the party to becoming a social democratic in the European context.

Though Kılıçdaroğlu's efforts at rejuvenating the party worked, the party did not win the presidential elections. At the 2014 local elections, the CHP received 26.34% of the overall vote. The CHP-backed candidate Ekmeleddin İhsanoğlu was able to get only 38.44% of the votes during the presidential election five months later. CHP received 25% in the June 2015 election, and erosion of support for the AKP resulted in a hung parliament. After some negotiations, CHP rejected the possibility of a grand coalition with AKP. A subsequent snap election in November returned a AKP's majority government, and CHP again received 25%.

For the 2018 general election, Muharrem İnce, a member of parliament for Yalova, was announced as the presidential candidate of the Republican People's Party (CHP) on 3 May 2018. İnce's campaign adopted the slogan “Türkiye’ye güvence Muharrem İnce”, roughly translating to "Muharrem İnce, an assurance to Turkey", and that it kicked off with an election rally in his home city of Yalova on 5 May. İnce lost the election, receiving 30% of the vote without a second round in the run-off election. When it came to the parliamentary election, CHP, Good Party, Felicity, and Democrat Party established the Nation Alliance to challenge the AKP and MHP's People's Alliance in the 2018 Parliamentary elections. Though CHP's vote was reduced to 22% due to strategic voting for other parties, the alliance received 33% of the vote.

The Nation Alliance was reestablished for the 2019 local elections, which had great gains for the CHP, winning almost 30% and the municipal mayoralties of Istanbul and Ankara. Some consider their new respective mayors Ekrem İmamoğlu and Mansur Yavaş possible candidates for the upcoming 2023 presidential election. Kılıçdaroğlu and Good Party's leader Meral Akşener continue to closely cooperate as opposition parties, as the opposition gets high support due to the ongoing crisis’ in the country.

References 

Republican People's Party (Turkey)
Republican People's Party